Doi Ang Khang is a mountain in Fang District, Chiang Mai Province, Thailand. It is part of the Daen Lao Range that straddles both sides of the Burmese-Thai border. It is the site of an agricultural station, the first research station set up by King Bhumibol Adulyadej in 1969.

Climate
The temperature average is 19.6 °C. The highest temperatures range from 35-38 °C in April. The lowest temperature recorded is -3 °C in January. The rainfall average is 1906 mm per year.

Ang Khang Royal Agricultural Station
The agricultural station researches and cultivates temperate climate fruits, flowers, and vegetables. At present, the station has more than 12 species of temperate fruits such as raspberries, peaches, plums, kiwis, and strawberries, and more than 60 species of vegetables such as carrots, Brussels sprouts, and peas, and more than 50 species of temperate flowers such as carnations and roses.

Gallery

References

External links

Tourism Authority of Thailand: Doi Angkhang

Daen Lao Range
Geography of Chiang Mai province
Tourist attractions in Chiang Mai province